Qualifications Wales is a Welsh Government sponsored body, responsible for the recognition of awarding bodies and the review and approval of non-degree qualifications in Wales. It was established by the Qualifications Wales Act 2015 and became operational from 21 September 2015.

It regulates awarding bodies delivering those qualifications taken in schools and colleges, such as GCSEs and A levels, but also vocational qualifications and the Welsh Baccalaureate. The organisation has over 75 staff, in a mix of regulatory, research, policy and development roles. Its offices are based in Imperial Park, Newport.

Responsibilities

As set out in the Act, the body has two principal aims and responsibilities:

ensuring that qualifications, and the Welsh qualification system, are effective for meeting the reasonable needs of learners in Wales;
promoting public confidence in qualifications and in the Welsh qualification system

See also
 Education in Wales
 National Assembly for Wales

References

External links
 Qualifications Wales

Welsh Government sponsored bodies
Education in Wales